Marquess of Larios is a hereditary title in the Peerage of Spain, granted in 1865 by Isabella II to Martín Larios, senator of the kingdom and one of the most important industrial businessmen in 19th century Spain.

Marquesses of Larios (1865)

Martín Larios y Herreros, 1st Marquess of Larios
Manuel Domingo Larios y Larios, 2nd Marquess of Larios
José Aurelio Larios y Larios, 3rd Marquess of Larios
José Antonio Larios y Franco, 4th Marquess of Larios
José Larios y Fernández de Villavicencio, 5th Marquess of Larios
José Carlos Fernández de Villavicencio, 6th Marquess of Larios

See also
Spanish nobility

References

Marquesses of Spain
Lists of Spanish nobility